Save the Last Dance for Me was Ben E. King's 15th album and 14th studio album. It was released under the EMI-Manhattan label.  The album was released in 1987 and was King's first release in six years.  All the tracks are new recordings of hits by King's old group The Drifters, originally recorded between 1959 and 1964.  Note that King did not originally sing lead on all the Drifters versions of these songs, having left the Drifters in 1960.

This was King's last new release on an LP.  Subsequent studio releases were issued on CD as the format became more popular.

Track listing
Tracks marked (*) are re-recordings of a Drifters hit which originally featured King on lead vocals.  Other tracks are re-recordings of Drifters hits which did not originally feature King.

"Save The Last Dance For Me"
"Because Of Last Night"
"Lover's Question"
"Whatever This Is (It Ain't True Love)"
"Halfway To Paradise"
"Let A Man Do It For Ya"
"I Cry For You"
"Test Of Time"
"Two Lovers"

1987 albums
Ben E. King albums
Albums produced by Lamont Dozier
Albums produced by Mick Jones (Foreigner)
Albums produced by John Paul Jones (musician)